The Klondike Gold Rush is commemorated through film, literature, historical parks etc.

Literature

Amongst the many to take part in the gold rush was writer Jack London, whose books The Call of the Wild (1903), White Fang (1906), and his short story "To Build a Fire" (1902 and 1908), were influenced by his northern experiences. London was inspired to write stories by various adventurers he met. The Thousand Dozen for instance was inspired by a brief market corner on eggs created by "Swiftwater" Bill Gates. Part I of Jack London's 1910 novel Burning Daylight is centered on the Klondike Gold Rush. 

Another literary luminary connected with the rush, and whose cabin still stands in Dawson City, was folk-lyricist Robert W. Service, whose short epics The Shooting of Dan McGrew (1907) and other works describe the fierce grandeur of the north and the survival ethic and gold fever of men and women in the frozen, gold-strewn north. Service's best-known line is the opening of The Cremation of Sam McGee (1907), which goes;

There are strange things done in the midnight sun
By the men who moil for gold;

One of the last books of Jules Verne, Le Volcan d'Or (The Volcano of Gold), deals with the terrible hardships endured by the gold-seekers in the Klondike.  The Klondike became a popular setting for adventure stories and travel memoirs in North American and European markets.

James A. Michener's 1988 novel Alaska (chapter VIII) and his short novel Journey describe the harsh realities of the Klondike Gold Rush using fictional characters.

  The 1997 book "Jason's Gold" by Will Hobbs (not published until 1999) was about a boy who went to Klondike in search for gold and his experience there.

Canadian author Vicki Delany writes the Klondike Gold Rush series of mystery novels from Dundurn Press, which include Gold Digger (2009) and Gold Fever (2010) and Gold Mountain (May 2012).

Film and television
Charlie Chaplin's silent film The Gold Rush (1925), the highest grossing silent comedy, was set in the Klondike. Also about the gold rush were Lev Kuleshov's silent-era adaptation of Jack London's "The Unexpected" By the Law (1926), the silent epic The Trail of '98 (1928), and Mae West's Klondike Annie (1936).

A number of animated cartoons satirized the Klondike Gold Rush, including:
 The Klondike Kid (Walt Disney, 1932), starring Mickey Mouse
 Dangerous Dan McFoo (Warner Bros., 1939)
 The Shooting of Dan McGoo (MGM, 1945)
 Klondike Casanova (Famous Studios, 1946), starring Popeye the Sailor
 Bonanza Bunny (Warner Bros., 1959)
 “14 Carrot Rabbit” (Warner Bros, 1952), starring Bugs Bunny and Yosemite Sam

The 1946 comedy Road to Utopia, directed by Hal Walker and starring Bing Crosby, Bob Hope, and Dorothy Lamour, is set during the rush. 

Life in Dawson City during the gold rush was the subject of the 1957 National Film Board of Canada (NFB) documentary City of Gold, directed by Colin Low (filmmaker) and Wolf Koenig and narrated by Pierre Berton. The documentary won the Palme d'Or at the Cannes Film Festival for best short film and received an Academy Award nomination for Best Short Subject, Live Action Subjects.

The 1955 film The Far Country is a Western set in Skagway and Dawson City during the gold rush era. It was directed by Anthony Mann and stars James Stewart, Ruth Roman, Corinne Calvet, and Walter Brennan.

The gold rush was the subject of the NBC series Klondike, which aired from 1960–1961. It starred Ralph Taeger and James Coburn and episodes were directed by William Conrad, Elliott Lewis, and Sam Peckinpah.

The 1978 TV special What a Nightmare, Charlie Brown! is set during the Gold Rush, but is disputed to be the 1925 serum run to Nome.

The 1980 film Klondike Fever depicts Jack London during the gold rush and stars Jeff East as London alongside Rod Steiger as Soapy Smith, Lorne Greene as Sam Steele, and Gordon Pinsent as Swiftwater Bill.

The 2012 episode "Murdoch of the Klondike" of the series Murdoch Mysteries is set during the gold rush and guest stars Aaron Ashmore as Jack London and Matt Cooke as Sam Steele.

The 2014 Discovery Channel miniseries Klondike stars Richard Madden as Bill Haskell, a real-life adventurer who travels to Yukon, Canada, in the late 1890s, during the gold rush. Directed by Simon Cellan Jones, it also features Abbie Cornish as Belinda Mulrooney, Sam Shepard as William Judge, Marton Csokas as Sam Steele, Ian Hart as Soapy Smith, Johnny Simmons as Jack London, and Colin Cunningham as Swiftwater Bill.

The TG4 series An Klondike (Dominion Creek in the United States) aired for two seasons from 2015–2017 and stars Owen McDonnell, Dara Devaney, and Seán T. Ó Meallaigh as three fictional Irish brothers who become involved in the gold rush. Set in the fictional town of Dominion Creek, Skookum Jim (portrayed by Julian Black Antelope), Belinda Mulrooney (portrayed by Bríd Ní Neachtain), Soapy Smith (portrayed by Michael Glenn Murphy), Sam Steele (portrayed by Steve Wall), and William Judge (portrayed by Clive Geraghty), also appear in the series.

Music and Theater
The Klondyke march and two step with music by Oscar Telgmann was published in Kingston, Ontario by the Music Emporium, c. 1897.
Dawson City was also the starting place of impresario Alexander Pantages. He opened a small theater to entertain the miners. He also became the partner and lover of "Klondike Kate" Rockwell. Soon, however, his activities expanded and he became one of America's greatest theater and movie tycoons.

The song "Gold Dust" by Canadian independent artist Right On Yukon makes multiple references to the hardships endured by fortune seekers and animals along the White Pass trail from Skagway to Dawson.

Popular culture
Carl Barks' 1950s Scrooge McDuck comics established the character as a successful participant in the Klondike rush when he was young, around the turn of the century. While Barks was content with leaving Scrooge's backstory of his Klondike days at the level of short flashbacks, his successor Don Rosa has gone to extend Barks's legacy of short glimpses into Scrooge's gold rush exploits into a number of adventure stories, particularly Last Sled to Dawson and individual chapters of his opus magnum The Life and Times of Scrooge McDuck, which are chapter 8a: King of the Klondike, chapter 8b: The Prisoner of White Agony Creek, and chapter 8c: Hearts of the Yukon.

Soapy Smith is the villain in the Lucky Luke album Le Klondike, by Morris, Yann and Jean Léturgie. The story features Smith's saloon and fake telegraph, but set in Dawson rather than Skagway.

Lefty Frizzell's 1964 song "Saginaw, Michigan" tells the tale of a poor fisherman who feigns the discovery of Klondike gold in a plot to remove the hostile father of the woman he loves.

A game called The Yukon Trail was created by MECC in 1994. There is also a populaire solitaire called Klondike.

In addition, the Klondike gold rush proved to be one of the most famous eras of the Royal Canadian Mounted Police's history. Not only did the exemplary conduct of the force ensure its continuation at a time when its dissolution was being debated in the Parliament of Canada, but the Force's depiction in popular western culture is often set at this time. The most popular examples include dramatic depictions such as the radio series Challenge of the Yukon and comedic ones like Dudley Do-Right.

A certain amount of slang came out of the gold rush. Experienced miners were often known as "Sourdoughs". Potential miners new to the Klondike  were known as "Cheechakos", from Chinook Jargon. These two names live on in Dawson City, in tourist literature, and enjoy occasional usage by miners still working the tributaries of the Yukon River and Klondike River as well as in literature relating to the Klondike gold rush era.

Celebrations
The gold rush was celebrated in the city of Edmonton, Alberta, with Klondike Days (now simply K-Days), an annual summer fair with a Klondike gold rush theme. Although far away from Dawson City and the Klondike River, Edmonton became known as a "Gateway to the North" for gold prospectors en route to Canada's North. It was in the city that many would collect the necessary goods for trekking up north in search of wealth. Individuals and teams of explorers arrived in Edmonton and prepared for travel by foot, York boat, dog team, or horses. Travel to the Yukon over land via what was sometimes called the "all Canada" route—and the prospectors that took this route—were often referred to as "overlanders". Few overlanders made it to the Klondike (160 out of about 1,600 that started).

Alberta's Northlands Association, which is based in Edmonton, honoured the memory and spirit of the overlanders with Klondike Days. For many years, Klondike Days was a fun summer exhibition with themed events such as the Sunday Promenade, the Sourdough raft race, free pancake breakfasts, saloons, gold panning and era costume parties.  Despite the many sad realities of the gold rush, Edmonton appreciated the Klondike spirit, which was characterised by a tenacious hope for success in the face of hardship, and an energetic zest for life. As a fair theme it was meant to provide the impetus for fun fantasy characters (e.g., Klondike Mike (Bobby Breen), Klondike Kate, The Klondike Kid (Ken Armstrong), Klondike Kitty (Debra Cook), Klondike Kattie to mention but a few) and fun events celebrating an interesting time. Many in the Yukon resented Edmonton's Klondike celebrations because of their historical inaccuracy and the perceived competition with the Yukon's tourism. The sentimental aspect of the gold rush lost its popular appeal in the 1980s and 90s and in 2003 the theme was dropped.

In addition, every other summer, on odd numbered years, the sleep away camp Camp Shohola for Boys has what it calls Klondike Day. In the morning an area of camp, including the creek that runs through the camp, are staged as Dawson City and campers run into the creek to search for "gold." In the afternoon they receive "money" for their prospecting and attend a camp wide carnival.

In 2016, a BBC History TV series 'Operation Gold Rush' was co-hosted by Felicity Aston, the British explorer, retracing the route across the Yukon of the 1898 Klondyke Gold Rush. In 2019, as a way to celebrate the original Klondike Gold Rush, the Yukon government attempted to  crowdsource a second Gold Rush by inviting the public to  buy perks via Indiegogo. Using the money raised, the government bought real Klondike gold and sprinkled it into the Territory's creeks. They then invited people to pan it back out as a re-creation of the original Klondike Gold Rush of the 1890s.

See also
An Klondike
The Chechahcos, 1924 film
Klondike, miniseries

References

Klondike Gold Rush
Klondike Gold Rush
Klondike Gold Rush
Klondike Gold Rush in fiction